Tucson Estates is a census-designated place (CDP) in Pima County, Arizona, United States. The population was 9,755 at the 2000 census.

Geography
Tucson Estates is located at  (32.180867, -111.109661).

According to the United States Census Bureau, the CDP has a total area of 35.1 square miles (90.9 km), all  land.

The census area is made up of several housing developments.  The primary ones are
 Tucson Estates Property Owners Association
 Tucson Estates II (Sometimes called the Foothills)
 Other, smaller housing communities

Demographics

At the 2000 census there were 9,755 people, 4,222 households, and 2,883 families living in the CDP. The racial makeup of the CDP was 83.8% White, 0.7% Black or African American, 1.7% Native American, 0.3% Asian, <0.1% Pacific Islander, 11.5% from other races, and 2.0% from two or more races.  23.7% of the population were Hispanic or Latino of any race.
Of the 4,222 households 19.2% had children under the age of 18 living with them, 57.2% were married couples living together, 7.4% had a female householder with no husband present, and 31.7% were non-families. 27.1% of households were one person and 15.8% were one person aged 65 or older.  The average household size was 2.31 and the average family size was 2.77.

The age distribution was 19.4% under the age of 18, 5.0% from 18 to 24, 20.1% from 25 to 44, 25.5% from 45 to 64, and 30.0% 65 or older.  The median age was 50 years. For every 100 females, there were 91.5 males.  For every 100 females age 18 and over, there were 90.5 males.

The median household income was $36,183 and the median family income  was $40,212. Males had a median income of $30,833 versus $24,071 for females. The per capita income for the CDP was $18,771.  About 6.2% of families and 7.7% of the population were below the poverty line, including 10.6% of those under age 18 and 5.9% of those age 65 or over.

References

Census-designated places in Pima County, Arizona
Populated places in the Sonoran Desert
Census-designated places in Arizona
Arizona placenames of Native American origin